The D'Aguilar Highway is a two-lane highway linking the Bruce Highway near Caboolture with Kingaroy in the state of Queensland, Australia. Major towns along the route include Woodford, Kilcoy, Blackbutt, Yarraman, Nanango and Kingaroy. The D'Aguilar Highway's highest elevation along its length is 527 m just north of Yarraman, and the lowest point is at 26.8m just west of Caboolture.

As of 13 December 2007, the D'Aguliar Highway bypasses Caboolture to the north.

State Route 85 

Future developments

Proposed Kilcoy bypass 
In January 2009, the Department of Transport and Main Roads published details of the preferred design for a bypass of the Kilcoy township. The proposed route follows an abandoned rail corridor, and would have minimal impact on existing infrastructure.

In 2021 significant changes were made to the two main intersections in Kilcoy to improve traffic flow. This seems to have been done as an alternative to the proposed bypass.

Upgrades

Safety improvements 
A project to provide safety improvements between Sandy Creek and Kilcoy, at a cost of $19 million, was to be completed in late 2022.

Wide centre line treatment 
A project to provide wide centre lines near Wamuran, at a cost of $12 million, was expected to complete in mid-2022.

Major Intersections 
Intersections are listed from west to east.

Caboolture Connection Road 

The Caboolture Connection Road (CCR) is a  former section of the D'Aguilar Highway that runs south-east from the highway at Moodlu to the Bruce Highway in Caboolture, Queensland, Australia. It is a state-controlled regional road (number 9905) rated as a local road of regional significance (LRRS).

CCR Route description 
The road commences at an intersection with the D'Aguilar Highway (State Route 85) in the locality of Moodlu. It starts as Williams Road and crosses the highway on an overbridge. It then runs south-east as King Street, passing the exit to Bellmere Road to the south-west, and continuing through Caboolture to an intersection with Burpengary–Caboolture Road and Beerburrum Road. It continues east as Lower King Street, crossing the railway line and reaching a bridge over the Bruce Highway, where it ends.

The physical road continues east as Caboolture-Bribie Island Road (State Route 85).

CCR History 
With the opening of a new section of road in 2007 to enable the D'Aguilar Highway to bypass the Caboolture CBD, the bypassed section was renamed Caboolture Connection Road.

CCR Upgrade project 
A project to upgrade signals and improve intersections on this road, at a cost of $7.5 million, was in construction in July 2022, with most sub-projects already completed.

CCR Major intersections 
All distances are from Google Maps. The entire road is within the Moreton Bay local government area.

Gallery

See also 

 Highways in Australia
 List of highways in Queensland
 Bridges over the Brisbane River
 List of highways numbered 85

References

External links 

Highways in Queensland
Roads in Queensland